Stanley M. Brooks is an American film and television producer. He has produced more than 60 productions for film and television as well as several critically acclaimed miniseries including Broken Trail and Prayers for Bobby.

Career
A graduate of Brandeis University, Brooks also holds a master's degree in fine arts from the American Film Institute where he is also currently an adjunct professor.

In the 1980s, Brooks served as president of Guber-Peters Television. Under his leadership, the company produced many notable projects including Barry Levinson's Rain Man, which went on to win the Academy Award for Best Picture at the 1988 Academy Awards. In 1989, Brooke left to found his first independent production company, Once Upon a Time Films, which went on to produce a variety of television movies in the 1990s and 2000s.

In 2006, Brooks produced Broken Trail starring Robert Duvall and Thomas Haden Church which won four Emmy Awards including Outstanding Miniseries, Outstanding Lead Actor in a Miniseries, and Outstanding Supporting Actor in a Miniseries and Best Casting for a Miniseries, Movie or Special. It was also nominated for three Golden Globe awards in the categories of Best Picture, Best Actor and Best Supporting Actor.

In 2009, Brooks produced the telefilm Prayers for Bobby, which earned an Emmy nomination for Outstanding Made for Television Movie as well as both Emmy and Golden Globe nominations for Sigourney Weaver's portrayal of Mary Griffith.

Governor Arnold Schwarzenegger appointed Brooks as chairman of the California Film Commission in 2010 where he helped pass the first tax incentives package for the entertainment industry in California history, bringing tens of thousands of jobs back to the state.

Personal life
Brooks founded The Hollywood Indies Little League Foundation, a charitable organization that in 1995 brought Little League baseball back to an abandoned park in South Los Angeles. It is now the city's largest Little League program. The following year, Brooks was recognized by the Los Angeles County Board of Supervisors for his special contribution to the parks and children of L.A.

He is married to Tanya Lopez, a former ICM agent and current head of the original movies division at Lifetime Networks. They have three children together ages 28, 26, and 18.

References

External links
 

American entertainment industry businesspeople
American film producers
American film directors
American television producers
AFI Conservatory alumni
Brandeis University alumni
Living people
Year of birth missing (living people)